Rădulești (Rădulești-Filitis from 1956 to 1960; Brazii from 1960 to 2011) is a commune located in Ialomița County, Muntenia, Romania. It is composed of three villages: Movileanca, Rădulești and Răsimnicea.

References

Communes in Ialomița County
Localities in Muntenia